Naseeti is a village located in Mant Tehsil, Mathura district, Uttar Pradesh, India.  

Villages in Mathura district